Green River is a city in Emery County, Utah. The population was 847 at the 2020 census.

History
The city of Green River is located in ancestral Ute lands, in the home locale of the Seuvarits/Sheberetch band of Ute people. The Old Spanish Trail trade route passed across the Green River in the area of modern Green River from 1829 into the 1850s.

John Wesley Powell embarked on the first of two voyages down the Green River in May 1869 and floated the river to its confluence with the Colorado and beyond. Powell left a detailed account of the river and the surrounding landscape and prepared the first thorough maps of the river basin. Powell left his mark in other ways as well. He and his men named most of the canyons, geographic features, and rapids along the Green River during his two voyages in 1869 and 1871. Powell also paved the way for later generations of explorers and scientists interested in the unique geology of the basin of the Green River.

The settlement of the Green River started as a river crossing for the U.S. mail. In 1876, Mr. Blake set up a ferry and way station on the east side of the river. It became a stopover for travelers with a ferry transporting people, supplies, and animals across the river.

In 1883 the line commonly known as the Utah Division of the Denver and Rio Grande Western Railroad was built, and a train station was opened. The west side of the river became known as "Greenriver" (later changed to "Green River"), and the east side of the river became known as "Elgin", and is still referred to by that name today. With the railroad coming, the town quickly went from a small farm hamlet to a boom town, with workers coming to build the bridge and the roadbed for the railroad. After the railroad's completion, the Green River became a fueling and watering stop for the railroad, with switching yards and engine sheds. A hotel called the Palmer House was built and became the scheduled meal stop for trains from both directions for many years. Green River enjoyed the railroad boom until 1892 when the railroad transferred most of its operations to Helper. The population of the town declined significantly.

Throughout the 1940s, 1950s, and 1960s, the mining of uranium played a significant role in the economy of Green River. Several trucking companies hauled ore from mines in the Four-Corners Mining District west of Green River, the San Rafael Swell, the Henry Mountains, and the area that is now Lake Powell.

The U.S. Air Force built the Green River Launch Complex outside Green River in 1964. It was an annex of the U.S. Army's White Sands Missile Range. From 1964 to 1973, the Air Force launched 141 Athena missiles from the Green River complex, near the Crystal Geyser, as part of research to improve nuclear missiles.

Geography

The city is located on the banks of the Green River, a major tributary of the Colorado River. The San Rafael Swell region is located west of the city, while Canyonlands National Park lies to the south. Today located exclusively in Emery County, the city was split between Emery and Grand counties until January 6, 2003, when Emery County's boundaries were expanded to follow the city limits.

Interstate 70 passes just south of the city, with access from Exits 160 and 164. Grand Junction, Colorado  and Denver  lie to the east.

Climate

Green River has a moderate desert climate (Köppen BWk).

Demographics

As of the census of 2020, there were 847 people and 330 households residing in the city. The population density was 34.45 people per square mile (13.30/km2). There were 397 housing units at an average density of 14.5 per square mile (5.6/km2). The racial makeup of the city was 70.2% White, 0% African American, 0.2% Native American, 0.5% Asian, 0% Pacific Islander, 11.6% from other races, and 17.2% from two or more races. Hispanic or Latino of any race were 33% of the population.

There were 330 households, out of which 60.9% were married couples living together, 16.1% had a female householder with no spouse present, and 18.2% had a male householder with no spouse present. The average household size was 2.77.

In the city the population was spread out, with 24.1% under 18, 9.8% from 18 to 24, 26.2% from 25 to 44, 17.2% from 45 to 64, and 13.6% who were 65 years of age or older. The median age was 32.8 years. 

The median income for a household in the city was $42,361. About 21.1% of the population were below the poverty line.

Economy
The economy relies heavily on hotels, fast food, and a few other restaurants and gas stations. The field is operated by Delta Petroleum, headquartered in Denver, Colorado.

Green River is famous for its melons, sold during the growing season, and has an annual Melon Days Festival. It is also a popular freeride mountain biking spot.

A proposed nuclear power plant, the Blue Castle Project, is located approximately five miles west-northwest of the town.

Infrastructure

Transportation
Amtrak, the national passenger rail system, provides service to Green River station, operating its California Zephyr daily in both directions between Chicago and Emeryville, California.

The Main road in Green River is a short State road, SR 19, with Business I-70.

Notable people
 Bert Loper, river-runner

In popular culture
The town serves as the initial setting of the 1932 Zane Grey novel Robbers' Roost.

Green River is one of the three homes of "Seldom Seen Smith" one of the protagonists of Edward Abbey's novel The Monkey Wrench Gang.

The popular Bud Shumway Mystery Series by Chinle Miller is set in Green River. The first book in the series is "The Ghost Rock Cafe" and is set in Green River and near Ghost Rock on the San Rafael Swell. To date, the series has nearly 20 books, most set in Green River or nearby environs.

The town becomes the new home of the Mousekewitz-family in An American Tail: Fievel Goes West as well as the main location in the subsequent television series Fievel's American Tails.

The town was featured in the film "The Wizard" with Corey Woods sneaking his brother, Jimmy, out of a mental institution to California for a Nintendo tournament.

Two chapters of Stephen King's novel The Stand are set in a post-apocalyptic Green River.

See also

 List of cities and towns in Utah

References

Further reading
Glennon, J.A., Pfaff, R.M. (2005). "The operation and geography of carbon-dioxide-driven, cold-water geysers," GOSA Transactions, vol. 9, pp. 184–192.

External links

 City of Green River official website

Cities in Emery County, Utah
Green River (Colorado River tributary)
Old Spanish Trail (trade route)
Populated places established in 1876
Cities in Utah
1876 establishments in Utah Territory